The women's long jump event at the 1972 European Athletics Indoor Championships was held on 12 March in Grenoble.

Results

References

Long jump at the European Athletics Indoor Championships
Long